The Sundance School, also known as Old Stoney, was built in 1923 in Sundance, Wyoming to serve both the elementary and the high school students of Crook County School District #1. The two-story sandstone building is one of the largest buildings in Sundance. It served the community as a school until 1971.

It had its own electrical generating plant in the basement, fueled by coal. The basement also featured the toilet rooms and play rooms. The first floor had four classrooms, a laboratory, a domestic science room, two commercial rooms and an assembly room. The stone is buff-colored Minnelusa sandstone from a quarry  distant. Construction was by the Marshall Engineer Company of Deadwood, South Dakota; the architects were Link & Haire of Billings, Montana.

The Sundance School was listed on the National Register of Historic Places in 1985.

References

External links
 Sundance School at the Wyoming State Historic Preservation Office

School buildings on the National Register of Historic Places in Wyoming
School buildings completed in 1923
Buildings and structures in Crook County, Wyoming
Defunct schools in Wyoming
1923 establishments in Wyoming
1971 disestablishments in Wyoming
National Register of Historic Places in Crook County, Wyoming